Mubby Creek is a stream in the U.S. state of Mississippi.

Mubby is a name derived from the Choctaw language purported to mean "one who gives and kills". The name sometimes is rendered as "Muddy Creek".

References

Rivers of Mississippi
Rivers of Pontotoc County, Mississippi
Mississippi placenames of Native American origin